Johan Bergenstråhle (13 May 1756 – 7 March 1840 in Stockholm) was a Swedish military officer who participated in Russo-Swedish War (1788-1790), and the Finnish War. In June 1808, he was sent as a colonel of the Swedish Army, with 1,000 men and four cannon to Vasa in order to retake the city from the Russians. The expedition failed and Bergenstråhle was wounded and captured on 25 June.

Military career
1788, lieutenant colonel at Nylands infanteri
1805, colonel at Västerbottens regemente
1813, retired as major general.

Personal life
Bergenstråhle was married on 12 October 1785 to Carolina Margareta von Cristiersson (1767-1799), and they had seven children. He remarried on 23 September 1800 to Ulrika Gustava Riddersvärd (1781-1849), and they had ten children.

Sources
 Nordisk Familjebok

1756 births
1840 deaths
Swedish Army generals
Swedish military personnel of the Finnish War